Wild Sky is a 2011 French autobiographical documentary film and cinematic essay/poem directed by Rachid B. and co-written by Florent Mangeot.

Plot 
At his dying father's bedside; Rachid B. recalls his strongest memories from his childhood in Morocco to recollections of his homosexuality and rejection of Christianity, right up to his recent conversion to Islam.

The film tells the story of his life, which he was never able to share with his father, and is "A powerful exploration of desire and of ones own identity."

Release
In April 2011, the film premiered at the Visions du Réel film festival.

Awards and recognition
 Best Documentary Feature and Best Documentary Director, LesGaiCineMad, Madrid International LGTB Film Festival, Spain, 2011.
 Special mention, Salina Doc Fest, Italy, 2011.
 Mention (short film competition), Les Écrans Documentaires, Arcueil, France, 2011.
 Nominated for the Best Doc-LGTIB award, Barcelona International Gay & Lesbian Film Festival, Spain, 2011.
 Clermont-Ferrand International Short Film Festival, National Competition, France, 2012.

Notes and references

External links 

 Wild Sky on the Swiss Films database

Swiss documentary film directors
Autobiographical documentary films
2010s French-language films
French short documentary films
2011 short documentary films
2011 films
French LGBT-related films
Documentary films about LGBT topics
2011 LGBT-related films
LGBT-related short films
French-language Swiss films
Swiss LGBT-related films
2010s French films